Polites is the name of two characters in Greek mythology of the Trojan War, and a genus of butterflies.

Polites (friend of Odysseus) is a Greek warrior in the Iliad.
Polites (prince of Troy) is a Trojan killed by Neoptolemus.

Other use 

 Polites (butterfly) is a genus of grass skipper butterflies

Notes

References 

 Homer, The Iliad with an English Translation by A.T. Murray, Ph.D. in two volumes. Cambridge, MA., Harvard University Press; London, William Heinemann, Ltd. 1924. . Online version at the Perseus Digital Library.
 Homer, Homeri Opera in five volumes. Oxford, Oxford University Press. 1920. . Greek text available at the Perseus Digital Library.
 Homer, The Odyssey with an English Translation by A.T. Murray, PH.D. in two volumes. Cambridge, MA., Harvard University Press; London, William Heinemann, Ltd. 1919. . Online version at the Perseus Digital Library. Greek text available from the same website.

Characters in Greek mythology